Eelke (Eeke) van der Veen (born 21 June 1946, in Wûnseradiel) is a former Dutch politician. As a member of the Labour Party (Partij van de Arbeid) he was an MP from 30 November 2006 to 19 September 2012. He focused on matters of public health.

References 
  Parlement.com biography

1946 births
Living people
Labour Party (Netherlands) politicians
Members of the House of Representatives (Netherlands)
People from Wûnseradiel
21st-century Dutch politicians